Markku Tapio Kanerva (born 24 May 1964) is a Finnish football manager, former player and elementary school teacher. He is the current manager of the Finnish national team.

Playing career
Kanerva, who is known by the nickname "Rive", was born in Helsinki. In Finland, he played as a central defender and full back in his hometown clubs HJK (1983–1990 and 1994–1998) and the season 1994 in the then local rivals FinnPa. The seasons 1991 and 1992, he played in the Swedish team IF Elfsborg. At international level, Kanerva went on to win 59 caps, and scored one goal for the Finnish national team. His last years as a player were shadowed by injuries, but he was still an important part of the HJK defence. His playing career ended in 1998 which included the historical Champions League participation. At the Finnish top league, he played total of 291 matches and scored 29 goals.

Coaching career
Kanerva worked as a school teacher already during his playing career, but since then he has been concentrating on football coaching. In 2001 and 2002, he was an assistant coach of Jyrki Heliskoski and Keith Armstrong in his former club HJK, and in 2003 he was the head coach of the East Helsinki club FC Viikingit. As the head coach of under-21 side, he led the team to the 2009 European Championships final tournament. In the same year, he was awarded the Coach of the Year in Finland.

On 29 November 2010, it was announced that Kanerva would coach the Finnish national team for the Spring period in 2011 while the Finnish FA will be seeking a new head coach. Mika Laurikainen took his place as the U21 coach. Kanerva had another spell as caretaker manager of Finland in 2015. In December 2016 he was permanently appointed manager of the Finnish national team on a three-year contract. In November 2019, he managed his Finland team to qualification for the UEFA Euro 2020.

Managerial statistics

Honours and Achievements

Player
HJK
Mestaruussarja / Veikkausliiga (5): 1985, 1987, 1988, 1990, 1997.
Finnish Cup (3): 1984, 1996, 1998.
Finnish League Cup (4): 1994, 1996, 1997, 1998.

Manager
Finland
UEFA Nations League,  (1): 2018–19 League C.

Sources

References

1964 births
Living people
Association football defenders
Finnish footballers
Finland international footballers
Finnish football managers
Finnish expatriate footballers
Finnish expatriate sportspeople in Sweden
Expatriate footballers in Sweden
Helsingin Jalkapalloklubi players
IF Elfsborg players
FC Honka players
FinnPa players
Finland national football team managers
UEFA Euro 2020 managers
Footballers from Helsinki